Needle Peak is a mountain in the Panamint Range in the northern Mojave Desert, in Inyo County, eastern California. 

The peak and Panamint Range are protected within Death Valley National Park.

See also
 
 List of mountain peaks of California
 List of U.S. National Parks by Elevation

References

 
 

Mountains of Inyo County, California
Mountains of Death Valley National Park
Panamint Range
Mojave Desert
Protected areas of the Mojave Desert
Mountains of Southern California